Max & Ruby is a Canadian children's animated television series based on the book series by Rosemary Wells and produced by Nelvana Limited.

Max & Ruby first aired in Canada on Treehouse TV on May 3, 2002. In the United States, the series first aired on Nick Jr. on October 21, 2002. The series ended on August 24, 2019. 130 episodes (334 segments) were produced.

Premise
Max & Ruby is about two rabbits: Max, a rambunctious and achievement-determined three-year-old and his sister Ruby, a seldom-patient, goal-oriented and sometimes, annoyingly-restrictive seven-year-old. The series takes place in a fictional town called Eastbunny Hop, in a universe populated by mostly bunnies and other creatures in the 1940s and 1950s. According to Wells, the series shows the relationship between Ruby, Max and the universal nature of sibling relationships.

Episodes

Characters

Main
 Max (voiced by Billy Rosemberg in seasons 1–3, Tyler Stevenson in seasons 4–5, Tyler James Nathan in some season 4 episodes, Drew Davis in a few season 5 episodes, Gavin MacIver-Wright in seasons 6–7) is a three and a half-year-old bunny. He has white fur, some clothes including some long overalls and is Ruby's younger brother. Prior to seasons 3–5, for the first few episodes of seasons 1 and 2, Max says one or two words (with the exception of a few episodes like Max's Bedtime and Ruby's Candy Store and his voiceover saying the episode's title card with the episodes that has "Ruby" in it). He does this again in season 5 (voiceover on the episode's title card; but only the ones that have Ruby). In seasons 6 and 7, Max (along with Morris) is 4-years-old and says most words in full sentences.
 Ruby (voiced by Samantha Morton in seasons 1–2, Rebecca Peters in seasons 3–5, Lana Carillo in seasons 6–7) is a 7-year-old white bunny. She has white fur and is Max's older sister. She's the more level-headed of the siblings. She is also a member of the bunny scouts—a formula similar to the "girl scouts".

Recurring
 Grace (voiced by Julie Lemieux) is one of Max and Ruby's new baby siblings and Oliver's older twin sister. Like Max, Grace likes getting dirty.
 Lemieux also voiced Oliver (one of Max and Ruby's new baby siblings and Grace's younger twin brother who, like Ruby, likes getting clean) and Louise (Ruby's best friend with tan/auburn fur who is also 7 years old).
 Mom (also known as Mrs. Bunny; voiced by Carolyn Larson) is Max and Ruby's mother. She and Ruby are close and she trusts Ruby's ability to help out with Max. She is Grandma's daughter-in-law and Grandpa's daughter.
 Dad (also known as Mr. Bunny; voiced by Paul Bates) is Max and Ruby's father. He is Grandma's son and Grandpa's son-in-law.
 Grandma (voiced by Kay Hawtrey) has grey fur and is the paternal grandmother to Max and Ruby. Max and Ruby sometimes compete as to whose ideas are better in order to impress her, but in the end she likes both of their ideas equally. She is Dad's mother and Mom's mother-in-law.
 Baby Huffington "Baby H" (voiced by Julie Lemieux) is Mr. and Mrs. Huffington's baby son and Bunny Scout Leader's grandson.
 Mrs. Huffington (voiced by Emily Scott in seasons 1–5, Catherine Disher in seasons 6–7) is the wife of Mr. Huffington, mother of Baby Huffington and daughter of Bunny Scout Leader.
 Mr. Huffington (voiced by John Torres) is the husband to Mrs. Huffington and father of Baby Huffington.
 Valerie (voiced by Loretta Jafelice) is a friend of Ruby; she has brown fur.
 Martha (voiced by Tabitha St. Germain) is a friend of Ruby; she has gold fur.
 Morris (voiced by Cameron Ansell in seasons 1–5, Nicholas Fry in seasons 6–7) is Louise's two-year-old cousin and Max's best friend.
 Roger Piazza (voiced by Kean Thompson in seasons 2–3, Joanne Vannicola in seasons 4–7) is the son of Mr. Piazza. He is older than Ruby and Louise; he is  years old.
 Bunny Scout Leader (voiced by Sarah Adams) is the leader of the Bunny Scouts and Mrs. Huffington's mother and Baby Huffington's maternal grandmother.
 Mr. Piazza (voiced by Jamie Watson) runs the local market in East Bunnyhop and is the father of Roger.
 Candice (voiced by Carolyn Hennesy) is the owner of the candy shop in East Bunnyhop.
 Rosalinda (voiced by Anne Hill) is the owner of a gift shop that sells jewellery and collectibles and a friend of Max and Ruby's grandmother, Mary.
 Katie (voiced by Yvonne Craig) is the waitress at the diner in East Bunnyhop.
 Miss Bunty (voiced by Judy Price) is Max's preschool teacher.
 Winston (voiced by Ethan Tavares) is one of Max's classmates who is confined to a wheelchair. He is also Max's second best friend.
 Lily (voiced by Isabella Leo) is one of Max's classmates who is Louise's younger sister and also is the other cousin of Morris.
 Priya (voiced by Labbiah Santos) is one of Max's classmates who is also one of Max's love-interests.
 Mr. Estevez (voiced by Carlos Díaz) is Ruby, Louise and Valerie's teacher in school.
 Antônio (voiced by Emílio Virguez) is one of Ruby's classmates. He is Max and Ruby's new friend.
Judy (voiced by Addison Holley) is Max and Ruby's newest friend, introduced in the season seven episode "Ruby's Rocking Bunnies / Max's Jump Shot".

Production
Nelvana Limited produced the show in association with Silver Lining Productions for its first five seasons (in 2005, Silver Lining itself was acquired by Chorion). 9 Story Entertainment overtook producing the animation from Nelvana in season 3 (and continues animating the series for seasons 4 and 5 while Chorion co-produced at the same time); with season 6, Nelvana still handles production of the series and also for the rest of its run.

Shortly after Chorion and its division Silver Lining Productions both close their doors when season 5 finished production, Atomic Cartoons overtook co-producing the series, season 6 of which premiered on September 18, 2016, with a new main voice cast and theme song (composed by Philip Lawrence and performed with and produced by Mark Ronson, now being slower and shifting the style to a synthesized, rap-like acoustic one), along with each episode now having 2 10-minute segments per half-hour, rather than having 3 7-minute segments as in the previous five seasons. Season 7 of the series premiered on August 12, 2018 (and reused Season 6's pattern—having two 10-minute segments per half hour rather than having three 7-minute segments as in the previous seasons).

In an interview with the US Nick Jr., Wells has stated about Max and Ruby's unseen parents that "we don't see Max and Ruby's parents, because [she] believe[s] that kids resolve their issues and conflicts differently when they are on their own. The television series gives kids a sense about how these two siblings resolve their conflicts in a humorous and entertaining way." However, in season 6, the series finally introduced Max and Ruby's parents.

In Latin American airings of season 5, the audio is PAL-pitched. (Notice that it was likely considered a tracking error.) However for season 6, the Latin American airings now have the correct pitch (NTSC audio).

Telecast and home media
Max & Ruby first aired on Treehouse TV in Canada on May 3, 2002. In the United States, the series first aired on Nick Jr. on January 7, 2003. The series also featured a British English dub that first aired on Nick Jr. in the UK and Ireland in February 2003.

As of 2022, the series is available to stream on Paramount+.

DVDs

United States
Paramount Home Entertainment is the DVD distributor for the series in the United States. As of March 29, 2012, 2.9 million DVD units of the series from Nickelodeon have been sold in the U.S. These DVDs (see below) only have episodes from the first five seasons.

Main series

Episodes on Nick Jr. compilation DVDs

See also
 Bluey: Another preschool animated series featuring two siblings as the main protagonists.

References

External links

  on Treehouse TV
 
  on Nick Jr.

2000s Canadian animated television series
2010s Canadian animated television series
2000s Canadian children's television series
2010s Canadian children's television series
2000s preschool education television series
2010s preschool education television series
2002 Canadian television series debuts
2019 Canadian television series endings
Canadian flash animated television series
Animated television series about rabbits and hares
Animated television series about siblings
Animated television series about children
Canadian children's animated comedy television series
Canadian children's animated fantasy television series
Canadian preschool education television series
Canadian television shows based on children's books
Fictional duos
Animated preschool education television series
Nick Jr. original programming
Treehouse TV original programming
NHK original programming
Television series by Nelvana
Television series by Corus Entertainment
Television series by 9 Story Media Group
English-language television shows
1979 children's books
Series of children's books
Children's books adapted into television shows
Book series introduced in 1979